Mimecyroschema tuberculipenne is a species of beetle in the family Cerambycidae, and the only species in the genus Mimecyroschema. It was described by Breuning in 1969.

References

Apomecynini
Beetles described in 1969
Monotypic beetle genera